Paul Perry (1891 – 1963) was an American cinematographer who worked in Hollywood from the silent era through the 1940s. He was the brother of fellow cameraman Harry Perry.

Biography
Paul was born in Colorado to Frank Perry and Fanny Teeter. He worked at Pickford-Fairbanks Studios on films like 1923's Rosita and was also noted for being one of Mack Sennett's cameraman. He was a founding member of the American Society of Cinematographers, and served on its board of governors early on.

Partial filmography

 Sweet Kitty Bellairs (1916)
 The Thousand-Dollar Husband (1916)
 The Lash (1916)
 Unprotected (1916)
 Lost and Won (1917)
 What Money Can't Buy (1917)
 The Ghost House (1917)
 Nan of Music Mountain (1917)
 The Hidden Pearls (1918)
 Wild Youth (1918)
 The Bravest Way (1918)
 Sandy (1918)
 The City of Dim Faces (1918)
 The Cruise of the Make-Believes (1918)
 Such a Little Pirate (1918)
 Good Gracious, Annabelle (1919)
 Everywoman (1919)
 At the End of the World (1921)
 The Little Minister (1921)
 Over the Border (1922)
 Pink Gods (1922)
 Singed Wings (1922)
 Ponjola (1923)
 Introduce Me (1925)
 Souls for Sables (1925)
 Caught in the Kitchen (1928)
 Hubby's Latest Alibi (1928)
 His New Stenographer (1928)
 Pink Pajamas (1929)
 Two Plus Fours (1930)
 The Bluffer (1930)
 Take Your Medicine (1930)
 Strange Birds (1930)
 A Hollywood Theme Song (1930)
 A Poor Fish (1931)
 The Bride's Mistake (1931)
 Just a Bear (1931)
 Movie-Town (1931)
 Dos amigos y un amor (1938)
 Concierto de almas (1942)

References

External links
 

American cinematographers
1891 births
1963 deaths
People from Denver